Several units of volume are used in petroleum engineering.

Units

Conversion factors
Oil conversion factor from m³ to bbl (or stb) is 6.28981100
Gas conversion factor from standard m³ to scf is 35.314666721

Note that the m³ gas conversion factor takes into account a difference in the standard temperature base for measurement of gas volumes in metric and imperial units. The standard temperature for metric measurement is 15 degrees Celsius (i.e. 59 degrees Fahrenheit) while for English measurement the standard temperature is 60 °F. Gas undergoes a slight expansion when the temperature is raised from 15 °C (59 °F) to 60 °F and this expansion is built into the above factor for gas.

The standard temperature and pressure (STP) for gas varies depending on the particular code being used. It is just as important to know the standard pressure as the temperature. Formerly, OPEC used 101.325 kPa (14.696 psia) but now the standard is 101.560 kPa (14.73 psia).

References

Petroleum engineering